Simon Roderick Poelman (born 27 May 1963, Hamilton) is a former New Zealand decathlete, who has been described as New Zealand's best ever all-round athlete. In the decathlon, his personal best of 8359 points (which is adjusted from 8366 points as it was hand timed) is still a New Zealand national record. This was set at the national athletics championships in Christchurch 1987. As well as being the national decathlon champion seven times. He was also the New Zealand senior men's national champion in several individual events including the 100m (once), 110m hurdles (seven times), long jump (twice), pole vault (three times), and shot put (once).

He won the bronze medal at the 1986 Commonwealth games in Edinburgh and at the 1990 Commonwealth games he won both the silver medal for decathlon and bronze in the pole vault. At the time of the Seoul Olympics he was ranked fourth in the world at decathlon, but had a bad start when a series of false starts led to a slow 100m time in his heat, and he finished in 16th place on 8021 points.

In 1998, Poelman was convicted of importing ecstasy tablets with a value of $NZ200,000 and sentenced to 3 years in prison. He initially denied the charges but later confessed.

Poelman returned to competitive athletics in 2004, setting a world age-group record, breaking a 23-year world record, for the decathlon.

He was awarded the New Zealand 1990 Commemoration Medal

Personal bests

References

External links
 Performances over 8000 points

1963 births
Living people
New Zealand decathletes
New Zealand masters athletes
New Zealand people of Dutch descent
Olympic athletes of New Zealand
Athletes (track and field) at the 1988 Summer Olympics
Athletes (track and field) at the 1992 Summer Olympics
Commonwealth Games silver medallists for New Zealand
Commonwealth Games bronze medallists for New Zealand
Commonwealth Games medallists in athletics
Athletes (track and field) at the 1986 Commonwealth Games
Athletes (track and field) at the 1990 Commonwealth Games
Athletes (track and field) at the 1994 Commonwealth Games
Athletes (track and field) at the 1998 Commonwealth Games
Sportspeople from Hamilton, New Zealand
Medallists at the 1986 Commonwealth Games
Medallists at the 1990 Commonwealth Games